is a village that comes under Sumerpur Tehsil in Pali district, Rajasthan. The Bharunda is an ancient village well connected to all surrounding villages and towns in the same vicinity.

Profile
Bharunda is a village in Pali district. Bharunda is on the bank of River Jawai, which has been dried due to deforestation and limited rainfall. Recently, the village got piped waterline and cement road which has improved hygiene level. Bharunda has two primary schools, one secondary and higher secondary school. It also has several temples such as Trikamji, Ramapir, Mamaji Bawasi. Bharunda also has connected local telephone exchange and post office. The STD dial code for Bharunda village is same as Sumerpur, that is 02933.

Climate and rainfall
The climate is somewhat different from that of other villages in western Rajasthan. Although, basically the summer season raises the temperature up to 46–47 degree Celsius at the peak time in May and June, a large variation in temperature  is found, due to adjoining green and hilly areas. Winters are moderately cool during December and January, lowering the mercury to 4–5 degree Celsius occasionally. Average rainfall during the months of July to October is 300 mmb£atw

Demographics

Bharunda village population is 4,042 according to census 2001, where male population is 2,015, while female population is 2,027.

Bharunda has a cosmopolitan population with all residents following the Hindu religion. It has members from all caste, Raj put Ranawat including 40 rawla like of bada rawla, chota rawla  ब्राह्मण, सुथार, रावना राजपूत , नाई,जैन, Vanik, Kumbhar, Meena, Darji, dmami, mali and Rabari. The mother tongue of the majority of people in Bharunda is Rajasthani ( read Marwari). Bharundaites are one of the thirteen million speakers in western Rajasthan speaking Marwari. Marwari (as well as indigenous Rajasthani languages) and Hindi are the most widely used languages in Bharunda.

Culture
Bharunda is culturally rich and has artistic and cultural traditions which reflect the ancient Rajasthani way of life. There is rich and varied folk culture which is often depicted symbolic of the state. The music is uncomplicated and songs depict day-to-day relationships and chores, more often focused around fetching water from wells or ponds.
Folk music is a vital part of Bharunda’s culture. Folk songs are commonly ballads which relate heroic deeds and religious or devotional songs known as bhajans and banis (often accompanied by musical instruments like dholak, sitar, sarangi etc.) are also sung.
Bharunda is culturally rich in traditional and colorful art. You will find people engaged in skillful Zari embroidery work and other handicraft items like wooden furniture and handicrafts, carpets and pottery. Reflecting the colorful Bharunda’s culture, the clothes have a lot of mirror-work and embroidery. A traditional dress for females comprises an ankle length skirt and a short top, also known as a lehenga or a chaniya choli. A piece of cloth is used to cover the head, both for protection from heat and maintenance of modesty. In the village dresses are usually designed in bright colors like Red, Maroon, blue, yellow and orange.

Geography
Bharunda is connected by road to via Sumerpur and Sheoganj. At around 2 km distance on Bharunda Sumerpur road, there is a mountain named Kawar (also known as Bhuria baba ri dhuni). There is a mythological tale which indicates that Raja Bhruthhari and Guru Gorakhnath visited this place and the dhuni was established during that time. Bharunda is on the bank of the River Jawai, which has been dried due to deforestation and limited rainfall. Recently, the village got piped waterline and cement road which has improved hygiene level.

Economy
Inhabitants of Bharunda are occupied by agriculture. Bharunda's economy is primarily agricultural and pastoral. Wheat and barley are cultivated all over, as are pulses, sugarcane, and oilseeds. Cotton and wheat are cash crops. There are mainly two crop seasons. The water for irrigation comes from wells and tanks. The Jawai Bandh Canal irrigates Bharunda and neighbouring villages.
Many people from Bharunda have shifted to Mumbai in search of better prospect. The Gorwal Brahmin sect is prominently involved in textile trade in Mangaldas Market in Mumbai, Gomtiwal Brahmin have concentrated in Kurla and Thane. Some of Kumbhar and representative of other castes have established medical stores in Mumbai. Suthars have a huge amount of construction work in the local areas. All of them have contributed in development of village and renovation of temples in village. Of late the so-called "Gen Next - ( Youth) of this tiny village have embarked on the corporate world, by working successfully with many renowned Indian and MNC companies."

Cuisine
People in and from Bharunda are quite fond of food. Cuisine is predominantly vegetarian and dazzling in its variety. Food is cooked with minimum use of water and people prefer to use more milk, buttermilk and clarified butter. Dried lentils, beans from indigenous plants like sangri, ker, etc. are used liberally. Gram flour is major ingredient here and is used to make some of the delicacies like Kachori, bhajiya, gatte ki sabji, pakodi, powdered lentils are used for papad. Bajra and corn is used majorly for preparations of traditional mouthwatering(drooling) dishes. People are also fond of  Raabdi, khichdi, dal-dhokdi and rotis like makki ri ghat and bajra ra hogra. Various chutneys are made from locally available spices like turmeric, coriander, mint and garlic.
The spice content is on the higher side, even by Indian standards. Bharundaites also relish ghee which is an integral part of many of the preparations. The most famous dish would probably be dal-bati, which are spicy lentils with baked balls of wheat with much ghee. The variety of sweet dishes is also immense and sweets are relished as much as the spicy curries. Some of the popular sweet dishes are Daadi ru Hiru, vasaniyu, mootichur, boondi and Kharmoo ra Ladoo, Sutarfini. Bharundaites don't savour everything for themselves but also for their guests. "Athithi Devo Bhava", Inhabitants believe in that and as the old Sanskrit saying goes, guests are fed with lot of affection, also termed manuhar or manvar. It is considered extremely rude to just lay the food on the table and expect guests to serve themselves.

Sweet dishes

Sweet dishes are never referred to as 'dessert' in Bharunda, because unlike desserts which are had after the meal, here sweets are had before the meal, with the meal, and after the meal! And typically there is no rationing. Dal Batti - Churma is the most popular delicacy, usually served with baatis and dal. It is coarsely ground wheat crushed and cooked with ghee and sugar. Traditionally it is made by mashing up wheat flour baatis or leftover rotis in ghee and jaggery.

Here is a list of popular dishes:
• Daal-Baati
• Malpua
• Sutarfini
• Raabdi
• Gatte
• Laapsi
• Chhaachh
• Kicha ki sabji
• Guwar flower ki saag
• Beans ki sabji
• Karela ki sabji
• Raabori
• Ghevar
• Vadi
• Raab
• Aloo matar ki sabji
• mango juice (popularly called as kairee ro russ : Russ - bati in summer season is equally popular.)

Music and entertainment
Folk songs are sung by women during marriages and other social occasions. Many villagers own TVs and radios. One can hear sounds of popular native songs (in the form of bhajans) and Hindi music emanating from stereos and other devices during late evenings and afternoons from different houses. Soulful and soothing bhajans are always accompanied by musical instruments like dholak, sitar, sarangi, etc. to add the cultural flavor.

Games and sports
Most of the children play cricket /Gulli Danda / Marbles. Some villagers also play volleyball and football. Villagers can be seen playing cards at Pechka (Village meeting place) .

Festivals
Villagers celebrate all major Hindu festivals. Some of the major festivals are Holi, Deepawali, Makar Shakranti, Raksha Bandhan, Teez, threedivshiha pratistha mahotshav of the 120-year-old Jain temple. Bharundaites celebrate holi/Dhuleti for 15 days. It is quite a carnival for them. Most of the people perform Gher dance at Sotara. Usually people spend the day throwing coloured powder and water at each other. Also a special drink called "thandai" is prepared, sometimes containing bhang (Cannabis sativa). People invite each other to their houses for feasts and celebrations later in the evening. Unlike others who use more long-lasting and strong colors (which are chemically enhanced and artificial colors) Bharundaites prefer to use coloured powders which has a medicinal significance and are traditionally made like out of Neem, Kumkum, Haldi, Bilva, and other medicinal herbs.

The temple of Sri Bihariji Maharaj is located in Bharunda.
This temple is worshipped by locals from the area. This sage is supposed to be the kul-devta of the Murarka's, Sultania's, Jalan's and other important Marwari communities. It is believed that this sage was born here many thousands of years ago. He was supposed to have enlightened the community folks living in this area. There is a Jain temple of Shri Shankheshwar Parasnath Bhagwan which is said to be 120 years old and has a fair in month of May and June in form of three days Mahotshav in which there is flag hosting of this temple as done by Bhaguben Multanmalji Mutha Pariwar for the last 120 years.

It is said that the foot prints are still visible and are worshipped here. There is a huge tree around a kilometre away where he did tapasya. Every year, there is a huge fair during the month of August and especially on Janamasthmi day (the day when Krishna was born). Thousands of devoted flank the temple of this auspicious day for the darshan of this sage and his devout god - Krishna himself. Recently, Sri Bihariji Seva Sadan has started magnification of the temple precincts.

Prominent /Well Known Torch Bearers
A) Late. Shri Achleshwarji Chimanlalji Dave
B) Late. Smt.Laxmiben Achleshwarji Dave

How to reach Bharunda
By Air: the nearest airport is Jodhpur or later on Udaipur.

By Train: The nearest railway station is Jawai Bandh which is approximately 25 km. away from Baharunda.

By Road: Rajasthan bus transport services is available from Ahmedabad to reach Bharunda or nearest getting down point is Sumerpur.

Villages in Pali district